Nick Pitarra is an American comic book artist known for his numerous collaborations with writer Jonathan Hickman, which include mini-series The Red Wing and ongoing The Manhattan Projects,  both released through Image Comics. Pitarra is a member of Ten Ton Studios.

Bibliography
Interior comic work includes:
Astonishing Tales vol. 2 #1-6: "Bobby and Sam in Mojoworld" (with Jonathan Hickman, anthology, Marvel, 2009)
Ten Ton Studios' Jam Comic #2: "page twenty-two" (script and art, webcomic, Ten Ton Studios, 2010)
S.H.I.E.L.D.: Infinity: "Chapter One: Colossus" (with Jonathan Hickman, one-shot, Marvel, 2011)
The Red Wing #1-4 (with Jonathan Hickman, Image, 2011)
The Manhattan Projects #1-9, 11-14, 16-18, 20, 22-25 (with Jonathan Hickman, Image, 2012–2014)
The Manhattan Projects: The Sun Beyond the Stars #1-4 (with Jonathan Hickman, Image, 2015)
Teenage Mutant Ninja Turtles Universe #6: "Squik" (script and art, anthology, IDW Publishing, 2017)
Where We Live: "How I Live Now" (with Neil Kleid, anthology graphic novel, Image, 2018)
Leviathan #1-3 (with John Layman, Image, 2018)
 The series was postponed indefinitely after issue 3.
Doom Patrol: Weight of the Worlds #4 (with Gerard Way and Jeremy Lambert, DC's Young Animal, 2019)

Covers only

References

Sources
Interviews

External links

Year of birth missing (living people)
Living people
American comics artists